The Récif fossile de Marchon - Christian Gourrat Regional Nature Reserve (RNR284) is a Regional Nature Reserve located in Auvergne-Rhône-Alpes.

Localisation 

The territory of the natural reserve is located in the Ain department, on the town of Arbent near the city of Oyonnax. Its reduced surface makes it the second smallest natural reserve of France.

History of the site and reserve 

The site was discovered in 1996 by Christian Gourrat, a naturalist from Oyonnax. Initially established as a Voluntary Nature Reserve under the name of Forêt de Marchon Natural Reserve, it is now registered at the regional inventory of geologic sites.

Ecology (biodiversity, ecological interest, etc.) 

The site is reduced to a limestone outcrop in the Marchon forest. It bears fossil animals from the Mesozoic era (140 My), particularly rudists. For several species, the reef represents the locus typicus. 

The local forest is mainly composed of beech and spruce.

Touristic and educational interest 

The reserve is open to the public. Any samplings are forbidden.

Administration, management plan, regulations

Tools and legal status

The natural reserve was established after a deliberation of the Regional Council of 06 March 2015.

References 

Protected areas established in 2015
Regional natural parks of France
Geography of Ain
Tourist attractions in Ain
Geologic formations of France
Cretaceous Europe
Limestone formations
Hippuritida
Fossiliferous stratigraphic units of Europe
Paleontology in France
Ain